
Gmina Baruchowo is a rural gmina (administrative district) in Włocławek County, Kuyavian-Pomeranian Voivodeship, in north-central Poland.

The gmina contains part of the protected area called Gostynin-Włocławek Landscape Park.

Villages
Gmina Baruchowo contains the villages and settlements of Baruchowo, Goreń Duży, Grodno, Kłótno, Kurowo-Kolonia, Kurowo-Parcele, Lubaty, Nowa Zawada, Okna, Patrówek, Skrzynki, Świątkowice, Zakrzewo and Zawada-Piaski.

Neighbouring gminas
Gmina Baruchowo is bordered by the gminas of Gostynin, Kowal, Lubień Kujawski, Nowy Duninów and Włocławek.

References
Polish official population figures 2006

Baruchowo
Włocławek County